The following highways are numbered 502:

Canada
 Ontario Highway 502

Costa Rica
 National Route 502

Hungary
 Main road 502 (Hungary)

India
 National Highway 502 (India)

Japan
 Japan National Route 502

United States
  Florida State Road 502 (former)
  County Road 502 (Brevard County, Florida)
  Louisiana Highway 502
  Maryland Route 502
  County Route 502 (New Jersey)
  New Mexico State Road 502
  Ohio State Route 502
  Pennsylvania Route 502
  Washington State Route 502
Territories
  Puerto Rico Highway 502